Taku Mayumura ( Mayumura Taku, 20 October 1934 – 3 November 2019) was a Japanese novelist, science fiction writer and haiku poet. He won the Seiun Award for Novel twice. His novel Shiseikan (Administrator, one story of the "Shiseikan series"), written in 1974, was translated into English by Daniel Jackson in 2004. Mayumura was also a young adult fiction writer whose works have been adapted into TV drama, film, and anime. Mayumura was an honorary member of the SFWJ (Science Fiction and Fantasy Writers of Japan).

Biography 
Mayumura was born as Murakami Takuji, at Osaka city, Osaka prefecture in 1934. He graduated from Osaka University in 1957 with a degree in economics, as well as a judo competition career at the Nanatei league. After graduation, he joined a company. While working at this company, he wrote short novels and submitted them to contests in commercial literary magazines.

He started professionally as a copywriter.

In 1960, he joined the SF fanzine Uchūjin. In 1961, he won the Best Story prize in the 1st Kūsō-Kagaku Shōsetsu Contest (later the Hayakawa SF Contest) for his novel Kakyū Aidea-man (Junior Idea-Man) and made his debut in the S-F Magazine with this work.

In 1965, he retired from the company and started working as an independent writer. Mayumura's first book, the science fiction novel Moeru Keisha, was published by Tōto Shobo in the same year. 

In 1976, his book Psychic School Wars was released, and was later adapted into both live action and anime versions.

In 1979, he won the seventh Izumi Kyōka Prize for Literature and the Seiun Award for his novel Shōmetsu no Kōrin, which is the representative work in his "Shiseikan series". In 1996, he won his second Seiun Award for another entry in the Shiseikan series, the long novel Hikishio no Toki.
 
His story Toraerareta School Bus inspired the 1986 anime film Toki no Tabibito - Time Stranger.

Mayumura was also a well-known young adult fiction writer.  His representative works in this field were Nazo no Tenkousei and Nerawareta Gakuen etc. These works were adapted into TV Drama series by NHK, and adapted into Cinema too. Other juvenile fictions by Mayumura were adapted into the anime Toki no Tabibito.

In 2002, his wife died of cancer. Mayumura had been writing a very short story every day for his wife, who was in the hospital bedridden since the cancer had been diagnosed. When his stories, which were written each day and numbered, reached to 1778, his wife died. These stories were compiled and published. The film Boku to Tsuma no 1778 no Monogatari, based on this true story, was released in 2011.

In 2004, he work Administrator was published in English.

As of 2008, Mayumura was a professor of the Graduate School of Osaka University of Arts.

In 2012, an anime film adaptation was being created of his science fiction children's novel Nerawareta Gakuen, which is a set in a prep school. At that time, the book had also inspired four live-action TV adaptations, and two live-action films.

In 2020, he was posthumously awarded the Meritorious Service Award in its 40th Nihon SF Taishō Awards by the Science Fiction & Fantasy Writers of Japan (SFWJ).

Haiku poetry 
Mayumura was also a haiku poet. He was a member of the haiku club in his high school. He posted his haiku work to the haiku coterie magazine Ashibu which Shūōshi Mizuhara (JA) presided over. Mayumura has been a coterie membera of the haiku magazine "Uzu". In 2009, he published a Haiku book "Kiri wo yuku".

Style of writings
As a literary theorist, he advocated the "Insider Bungaku-ron" (Theory of Literature by Insiders). Consistent with this theme, his novels frequently tackle the issues of problematic relations between individuals and the corporate or bureaucratic organizations to which they belong.

Mayumura wrote various stories. His stages of the fictions range from the ordinary life scenes of common people to the fantastic worlds hidden back in the daily life, to the inter-stellar federation of far future.

Especially, strange and fantastic aspects of the reality, adjacent to the ordinary life are the essence of his fantastic stories.

Personal life
He died early in the morning (at 04:01 AM in JST) of November 3, 2019 due to aspiration pneumonia in Osaka. His family stated he had been dealing with cancer for several years, and had been hospitalized on October 8, continuing to write in his bed until his death.

Awards 
 Prize at the 1st Kūsōkagaku Shōsetsu Contest for Kakyū Aidea-man 1961
 Izumi Kyōka Prize for Literature (JA)  for Shōmetsu no Kōrin 1979
 Seiun Award for Shōmetsu no Kōrin 1979
 Seiun Award for Hikishio no toki 1996

Works in English translation 
 Administrator (Kurodahan Press, 2004)
 "Fnifmum" (The Best Japanese Science Fiction Stories, Dembner Books, 1989 / Barricade Books, 1997)
 "I'll Get Rid of Your Discontent" (Speculative Japan, Kurodahan Press, 2007)

Works

Novels 
 Novels and Collections of novelettes and short stories, or Collection of short short stories.
 Moeru Keisha 1963, Touto Shobou
 Gen'ei no Kōsei 1966, Hayakawa Shobou
 EXPO' 87 1968, Hayakawa Shobou
 Wa ga Sexoid 1969, Rippu Shobou
 Techunit 1969, San'ichi Shobou
 Jun B-kyū Shimin 1966, Hayakawa Publishing, Hayakawa SF Series
 Bankokuhaku ga Yattekuru 1968, Hayakawa Publishing, Hayakawa SF Series
 Niji wa Kieta 1969, Hayakawa Publishing, Hayakawa SF Series
 Toki no Odysseus 1971, Hayakawa Publishing, Hayakawa SF Series
 C-seki no Kyaku 1971, Nihon Keizai Shinbunsha, 1973, Kadokawa Bunko
 Karera no Naka no Umi 1973, Hayakawa Publishing
 Kiga Rettō 1974, Hayakawa Publishing, (collaboration with Masami Fukushima)
 Salon wa Owatta 1974, Hayakawa Bunko JA
 Shiseikan (Administrator) 1974, Hayakawa Publishing
 Ano Shinju-iro no Asa wo... 1974, Kadokawa Bunko
 Kimyōna Tsuma 1975, Hayakawa Publishing, 1978 Kadokawa Bunko
 Ikyō Henge 1976, Kadokawa Bunko
 Nubatama no... 1978, Koudansha
 Shōmetsu no Kōrin 1979, Hayakawa Publishing
 Bokutachi no Pocket 1980, Kadokawa Bunko
 Nagai Akatsuki 1980, Hayakawa Publishing
 Pocket no ABC 1982, Kadokawa Shoten
 Pocket no XYZ 1982, Kadokawa Shoten
 Futsū no Kazoku 1984, Kadokawa Bunko
 Meikyū Monogatari 1986, Kadokawa Shoten
 Futeiki Esper 1–8, 1988–1990, Tokuma Shoten
 Hikishio no Toki 1–5, 1988-1995 Hayakawa Publishing
 Wonder Tea Room 1992, Jitsugyō no nihon
 Higawari Ichiwa, Book 1, Book 2 1998, Shuppan Geijutsusha
 Tsuma ni Sasageta 1778-wa (1,778 Stories dedicated to My Wife, [Tsuma ni Sasageta Sen Nana-hyaku Nana-jū Hachi-wa]) 2004
etc.

Shiseikan series 
The Shiseikan (Administrator) series is summarized as follows: In the distant future, the humans of Earth constitute the Terrestrial Federation; the Terrestrial humans have spread far across outer space and colonized numerous planets and solar systems. The Federation established local governments on those planets to establish law and order among the human settlers, and to mediate between Terrestrials and the sapient aliens who had been originally born, evolved and lived on certain of these planets before the settlers arrived. In the early period, the planets had been ruled by Federation-aligned military juntas; however, the Federation has begun to recall the military administrations and send civilian administrators to govern on their behalf. The troubles faced by these administrators constitute the stories of Shiseikan.
 Shiseikan (}, Administrators) 1974, Hayakawa Publishing
 Shōmesu no Kourin (The Corona of the Extinction) 1979, Hayakawa Publishing, Seiun Award 1979
 Nagai Akatsuki (Long Dawn) 1980, Hayakawa Publishing
 Hikishio no Toki (The Time at Low Tide) 1996, Hayakawa Publishing, Seiun Award 1996

Young adult fiction 
 Tensai wa Tsukurareru 1968
 Maboroshi no Pen Friend 1970, 2006
 Nazo no Tenkōsei 1972, 2004
 Nejireta Machi 1974, 2005
 Sangyō Shikan Kōhosei 1974
 Jigoku no Sainō 1975
 Nerawareta Gakuen 1976, 2003
 Omoiagari no Natsu 1977, Kadokawa Bunko (including Nagori no Yuki )
 Tozasareta Jikanwari 1977
 Naitara Shi ga Kuru 1977
 Shiroi Futōshiki 1978
 Tsukurareta Asu 1980
 Toraerareta School Bus) 1981-1983 Kadokawa Bunko, (New title: Toki no Tabibito 
 Shiirareta Henshin 1988

Historical story 
 Cartago no Unmei 1998, Shin Jinbutsu Ōraisha

Others or uncertain 
 Chikyū e no Tōi Michi 1970, Mainichi Shinbunsha
 Nijū-Yo-Jikan no Sinnyūsha 1974, Akimoto
 Waru-nori Ryokō 1975, Kadokawa Bunko
 Shin'ya Hōsō no Happening 1977, Akimoto
 Mōretsu Kyōshi 1977
 Shiroi Kobako 1977, Jitsugyou no Nihon
 Tōrisugita Yatsu 1977, Ruppu Shobo
 Henna Otoko 1978, Kadokawa Bunko
 Oshaberi Meiro 1979, Kadokawa Shoten
 Gekkō no Sasu Basho 1980
 Katamuita Chiheisen 1981, Kadokawa Bunko
 Sorezore no Magarikado 1986, Kadokawa Bunko
 Yūyake no Kaiten Mokuba 1986, Kadokawa Bunko
 Niji no Uragawa 1994, Shuppan Geijutsusha
etc.

Essays 
 Giyaman to Kikai (Glass and Machine) 1977, PHP Kenkyusho
 Teri-kageri no Fūkei - Kessaku Essay 1981.12, Kosaido shuppan
 Osaka no Machikado - Mayumura Taku Semba Essay 1995.11 San'itsu shobo

Haiku poetry 
 Kiri wo Yuku 2009

Works adapted into TV drama 
 Maboroshi no Pen Friend 1974, 2001
 Nazo no Tenkōsei 1975
 Nerawareta Gakuen 1977, 1982, 1987, 1997
 Jigoku no Sainō 1977
 Nagori no Yuki 1977, 1994

Works adapted into cinema film 
 Nerawareta Gakuen 1981 (Director:), 1997 (Director:)
 Nazo no Tenkōsei 1998 (Director:)
 Boku to Tsuma no 1778 no Monogatari based on his life episode and short stories.

Works adapted into anime film 
 Toki no Tabibito 1986 (Director: Mori Masaki)
 Neo Tokyo (Meikyuu Monogatari) 1987 (Directors: Rintaro, Yoshiaki Kawajiri, Katsuhiro Ōtomo)
 Nerawareta Gakuen 2012 (Director: Ryosuke Nakamura)

Notes and references

References 
 (ja) Masao Azuma & Ran Ishidō Nihon Gensō Sakka Jiten, Kokusho Kankokai, (2009),  pp. 648-649
 The Encyclopedia of Science Fiction, page 641
 References in the Article in JA-Wikipedia

External links

1934 births
2019 deaths
20th-century Japanese novelists
21st-century Japanese novelists
Japanese science fiction writers
Osaka University alumni
Academic staff of Osaka University
People from Osaka
Deaths from pneumonia in Japan
Japanese haiku poets